Shaarie Torah is a Conservative Jewish congregation and synagogue in Portland, Oregon, United States. The congregation was founded in 1858, while Oregon was still a territory, and built its first synagogue in 1859.

Architecture

Temple Beth Israel, a Reform Congregation at N.W. 19th and Flanders continues to serve the congregation. The congregation's first building was a modest, single story, pitched-roof, wood-framed, clapboard building with Gothic, pointed-arch windows and door.

This early structure was replaced by an 1889 synagogue building, which was destroyed by fire in December 1923. Designed by Portland architect Warren H. Williams, the building, called Moorish revival design in some sources, is elsewhere described as a combination of eclectic and Gothic revival styles, with two towers topped by bulbous domes. The Oregonian newspaper in 1923 described its style as "semi-Gothic and Mooresque". It was located at S.W. 12th and Main streets in downtown Portland.

It was replaced in 1928 by a notable Neo-Byzantine synagogue building at N.W. 19th and Flanders that continues to serve the congregation. It was listed as Temple Beth Israel on the National Register of Historic Places in 1979. It is considered one of the finest examples of Byzantine-style architecture on the west coast, and was inspired by the Alte Synagoge (Steelerstrasse Synagogue) in Essen, Germany.  The interior of Steelerstrasse, the first modern synagogue in Germany, was praised as Germany's most beautiful; it was destroyed during Kristallnacht.

A new synagogue opened on May 15, 1960, at Park Avenue and Jackson Street, but it was demolished a few years later due to the construction of Interstate 405. The current synagogue at 920 Northwest 25th Avenue was dedicated on June 13, 1965.

See also
Oregon Jewish Museum, houses the historical records of Congregation Beth Israel

References

External links
Congregation Shaarie Torah (official website)
Congregation Beth Israel (official website)

1928 establishments in Oregon
Byzantine Revival architecture in Oregon
Byzantine Revival synagogues
Conservative synagogues in Oregon
Jews and Judaism in Portland, Oregon
Northwest District, Portland, Oregon
Religious buildings and structures in Portland, Oregon